The following are the national records in athletics in Saint Vincent and the Grenadines maintained by the country's national athletics federation: Team Athletics Saint Vincent & The Grenadines (TASVG).

Outdoor

Key to tables:

h = hand timing

A = affected by altitude

NWI = no wind information

OT = oversized track (> 200m in circumference)

Men

Women

Indoor

Men

Women

Notes

References
General
World Athletics Statistic Handbook 2019: National Outdoor Records
World Athletics Statistic Handbook 2018: National Indoor Records
Specific

External links

Vincentian
records
Athletics
Athletics